Khas-Magomed Hadjimuradov (born December 18, 1953 in Kazakhstan) is a Chechen nationalist bard.

Khas-Magomed was born in the Zhambyl Province of Kazakhstan to Chechen parents, who had been forcibly removed from their homes in Chechnya as the result of the forced deportations of the Chechen and Ingush people to Central Asia on February 23, 1944. He spent much of his early youth in the village of Panfilovka in the Chuy Province of neighboring Kyrgyzstan, before his family returned their native village of Novye Atagi. After graduating from secondary school in 1971, he served in the Red Army from 1973 to 1975.

To bolster the national identity of the Chechen people, Khas-Magomed performed nationalistic songs of Chechen heroes on Soviet television, hoping to revive the national consciousness of the Chechens and to restore "k'onalah", or the code of ethics in Chechen culture.

External links
 Nizam TV Biographical Stub on Khas-Magomed Hadjimuradov
 Sobar Music Lyrics of Khas-Magomed Hadjimuradov
 "Invasion" by Khas-Magomed Hadjimuradov
 Zhaina-Nahskaya Library – "Verses" by Khas-Magomed Hadjimuradov

1953 births
Living people
Chechen male singers
Soviet male singers
Russian people of Chechen descent